Rachele Bruni (born 4 November 1990) is an Italian swimmer, specialising in open water long-distance races. She competed at the 2020 Summer Olympics, in 10 km open water.

Career
In 2015, Bruni became the first Italian swimmer to win the FINA 10 km Marathon Swimming World Cup. She won it again in 2016.

At the 2016 Summer Olympics in Rio de Janeiro, Bruni won the silver medal in the 10 km marathon, behind Sharon van Rouwendaal. She initially finished in 3rd position, just behind world champion Aurélie Muller, but the latter was disqualified for obstructing Bruni at the finish line. She has dedicated her medal to her girlfriend, Diletta Faina.

She is an 8-time gold medalist at the European Open Water Swimming Championships.

In 2019, she won for the third time the FINA/CNSG Marathon Swim World Series 2019.

During the 2019 World Aquatics Championships, held in Gwangju, Bruni won the bronze medal in the 10km and the silver medal in the 5km team.

Works

Volevo solo nuotare (200.000 bracciate con Rachele Bruni), the Bruni’s biography written by the Italian author Luca Farinotti was published in 2020. This book was very important in Italy as Rachele Bruni was the first Italian Olympic athlete to “come out”.  This news was deemed by the newspapers more interesting than her Olympic silver medal: instead Bruni tells the true sporting life of a woman. The book won Bancarella Selezione Sport, most prestigious sport books prize in Italy.

References

External links
 

1990 births
Living people
Italian female swimmers
Italian female freestyle swimmers
Italian female long-distance swimmers
Swimmers at the 2016 Summer Olympics
Olympic swimmers of Italy
European Aquatics Championships medalists in swimming
Medalists at the 2016 Summer Olympics
Olympic silver medalists for Italy
LGBT swimmers
Italian LGBT sportspeople
Olympic silver medalists in swimming
Sportspeople from Florence
Universiade medalists in swimming
World Aquatics Championships medalists in open water swimming
Universiade gold medalists for Italy
Swimmers of Gruppo Sportivo Esercito
Medalists at the 2011 Summer Universiade
21st-century Italian women